The 1998 Ohio Valley Conference men's basketball tournament was the postseason men's basketball tournament of the Ohio Valley Conference during the 1997–98 NCAA Division I men's basketball season. It was held February 24–March 1, 1998. The first round was hosted by the higher seeded team in each game. The semifinals and finals took place at Gaylord Entertainment Center in Nashville, Tennessee.

Top-seeded Murray State won the tournament, defeating  in the championship game, and received the Ohio Valley's automatic bid to the NCAA tournament. For the second consecutive year, Chad Townsend of Murray State was named the tournament's most valuable player.

Format
The top eight eligible men's basketball teams in the Ohio Valley Conference receive a berth in the conference tournament.  After the regular season, teams were seeded by conference record.

Bracket

References

Tournament
Ohio Valley Conference men's basketball tournament
Basketball competitions in Nashville, Tennessee
College sports tournaments in Tennessee
Ohio Valley Conference men's basketball tournament
Ohio Valley Conference men's basketball tournament
Ohio Valley Conference men's basketball tournament